The Pan American Wushu Championships is a continental wushu championship hosted by the Pan American Wushu Federation (PAWF), the official continental representative of Pan America to the International Wushu Federation (IWUF). The PAWF was founded at the 1995 World Wushu Championships in Baltimore, USA, and since 1996, the Pan American Wushu Championships have been held every two years.

The PAWF also hosts the Pan American Kungfu & Taijiquan Championships.

Championships

Pan American Wushu Championships 

Pan American Kung Fu and Taijiquan Championships

References 

Recurring sporting events established in 1996
Wushu competitions
Panamerican Championship